Amphisine is a genus of erebid moths, first described by Volynkin in 2019.

Species 

 Amphisine asaphes (Hampson, 1900)
 Amphisine cursiva (Černý, 2009)
 Amphisine latigrapha (Černý, 2009)
 Amphisine lutivittata (Wileman & West, 1928)
 Amphisine perpusilla (Walker, 1862)

References 

Moth genera
Nudariina
Moths described in 2019